Hiatella is a genus of small saltwater clams, marine bivalve molluscs in the family Hiatellidae.

Ecology
These bivalves are stationary suspension feeders. Some species bore into rock for shelter, others also live in rock but do not bore, instead they nestle in holes created by other organisms, or in other crevices. They may also live nestled within the holdfasts of kelps, within other organisms such as sponges, or partly buried in a sandy sediment.

Species
The number of species in the genus is unclear, and their unequivocal identification can be difficult. The following species are listed in MolluscaBase/WoRMS (2015):
 Hiatella antarctica (Philippi, 1845)
 Hiatella arctica (Linnaeus, 1767) (= Hiatella striata (Fleuriau, 1802) = Hiatella pholadis (Linnaeus, 1771))
 Hiatella arenacea (E.A. Smith, 1910)
 Hiatella australis (Lamarck, 1818)
 Hiatella azaria Dall, 1881
 Hiatella rugosa (Linnaeus, 1767) (= Hiatella gallicana (Lamarck, 1818))
 Hiatella glaciana
 Hiatella pholadis
 Hiatella striata

By molecular data, at least 13 different species of Hiatella were distinguished, but the correspondence between those taxa and the formal species names was not resolved.

References

Hiatellidae
Bivalve genera
Taxa named by Louis Augustin Guillaume Bosc